Bob Bryan and Mike Bryan were the defending champions but did not compete that year.

Jordan Kerr and David Macpherson won in the final 7–6(7–4), 6–3 against Julian Knowle and Jürgen Melzer.

Seeds

 Bob Bryan /  Mike Bryan (withdrew)
 Brandon Coupe /  Jim Thomas (semifinals)
 Mark Merklein /  Jeff Morrison (first round)
 Todd Perry /  Thomas Shimada (quarterfinals)

Draw

External links
 2003 Miller Lite Hall of Fame Championships Doubles Draw

2003 Hall of Fame Tennis Championships